Megalosphecia gigantipes is a moth of the family Sesiidae.  It is known from Cameroon.

References

Endemic fauna of Cameroon
Sesiidae
Insects of Cameroon
Moths of Africa